Enric Vallès Prat (born 1 March 1990) is a Spanish footballer who plays as a midfielder for Sandefjord Fotball. He began his career in the youth system of FC Barcelona before playing for NAC Breda, Birmingham City, UE Olot, UE Cornellà, CE Manresa and Harrisburg City Islanders.

Career
Born in Puig-reig, Barcelona, Catalonia, Vallès began his football career in the youth system of FC Barcelona. In 2008, he played alongside Gai Assulin and Iago Falque in the team that reached the final of the Spanish Youth Cup, in which they lost 2–0 to Sevilla's youngsters. Vallès left Barcelona in August 2008, as an 18-year-old, to turn professional with NAC Breda of the Dutch Eredivisie, signing a two-year contract.

Recommended by an agent who likened him to Albert Riera, then of Liverpool, Vallès had a week's trial with English Premier League club Birmingham City. The trial proved successful, and in May 2010, he signed a pre-contract agreement to join the club on 1 July upon the expiry of his contract with NAC Breda, for whom he had played four matches in the Eredivisie. In his first interview after joining Birmingham, Vallès described himself as a "left midfielder who can also play on the wing" whose main strengths were his dribbling and his work ethic; he also revealed his desire to play in the same team as fellow Spaniard Míchel. Manager Alex McLeish summed him up as a "big, tall, lad, left-sided and maybe not the explosion of some wingers, but a very good footballer".

After a successful pre-season, Vallès made his competitive debut for Birmingham in the second-round League Cup-tie against Rochdale on 26 August 2010. His only other appearance came in the next round of the League Cup, and a proposed loan move to League One (third-tier) club Brighton & Hove Albion or possible return to Spain came to nothing when the player suffered a stress fracture to his foot. He made a return to the first-team squad as an unused substitute for the final match of the season, which confirmed Birmingham's relegation from the Premier League, and the club took up their option to extend his contract for a further year. Vallès was occasionally included in the matchday squad during that year but made no more first-team appearances, and he was released when his contract expired at the end of the 2011–12 season.

On 15 November 2012, Vallès signed for UE Olot of the Spanish Tercera División. He scored four goals as Olot finished as champions of their group, thus qualifying for the promotion playoffs. Although Vallès suffered a hamstring injury in the second round of the playoffs that was to keep him out for what remained of the season, his team went on to defeat Arandina CF in the final round to earn promotion to the Segunda División B for the first time in the club's history.

Vallès was not kept on for the new season, and signed for another Tercera División club, UE Cornellà, in August 2013. Again, he contributed to the club's first ever promotion to the Segunda B, and again, he was released at the end of the season. Vallès then dropped down a level to the Primera Catalana to join CE Manresa for 2014–15.

Vallés signed for United Soccer League club Harrisburg City Islanders ahead of the 2015 season.

On 20 November 2015, Vallès signed a two-year contract with Norwegian First Division side Sandefjord.

Career statistics

References

External links

1990 births
Living people
People from Berguedà
Sportspeople from the Province of Barcelona
Spanish footballers
Footballers from Catalonia
Association football midfielders
FC Barcelona players
NAC Breda players
Birmingham City F.C. players
UE Olot players
UE Cornellà players
CE Manresa players
Penn FC players
Sandefjord Fotball players
Eredivisie players
Tercera División players
USL Championship players
Norwegian First Division players
Eliteserien players
Spanish expatriate footballers
Expatriate footballers in the Netherlands
Spanish expatriate sportspeople in the Netherlands
Expatriate footballers in England
Spanish expatriate sportspeople in England
Spanish expatriate sportspeople in the United States
Expatriate soccer players in the United States
Spanish expatriate sportspeople in Norway
Expatriate footballers in Norway